Abbott and Costello Meet the Mummy is a 1955 American horror comedy film directed by Charles Lamont and starring the comedy team of Abbott and Costello. It is the 28th and final Abbott and Costello film produced by Universal-International.

Plot
Two Americans, Abbott and Costello, who are stranded in Cairo, Egypt, happen to overhear Dr. Gustav Zoomer discussing the mummy Klaris, the guardian of the Tomb of Princess Ara. Apparently, the mummy has a sacred medallion that shows where the treasure of Princess Ara can be found. The followers of Klaris, led by Semu, overhear the conversation along with Madame Rontru, a businesswoman interested in stealing the treasure of Princess Ara.

Abbott and Costello go to the doctor's house to apply for the position to accompany the mummy back to America. However, two of Semu's men, Iben and Hetsut, murder the doctor and steal the mummy just before Abbott and Costello arrive. The medallion has been left behind, though, and is found by Abbott and Costello, who attempt to sell it. Rontru offers them $100, but Abbott suspects it is worth much more and asks for $5,000, which Rontru agrees to pay.  She tells them to meet her at the Cairo Café, where Abbott and Costello learn from a waiter that the medallion is cursed. They frantically try to give it to one another, until it winds up in Costello's hamburger and he swallows it. Rontru arrives and drags them to a doctor's office to get a look at the medallion under a fluoroscope. However, she cannot read the medallion's inscribed instructions, which are in hieroglyphics. Semu arrives, posing as an archaeologist, and offers to guide them all to the tomb. Meanwhile, Semu's followers have returned life to Klaris.

They arrive at the tomb, where Costello learns of Semu's plans to murder them all. Rontru captures Semu, and one of her men, Charlie, disguises himself as a mummy and enters the temple. Abbott follows suit by disguising himself as a mummy, and he and Costello rescue Semu.  Eventually all three mummies are in the same place at the same time, and the dynamite that Rontru intends to use to dig up the treasure detonates, killing Klaris and revealing the treasure. Abbott and Costello convince Semu to turn the temple into a nightclub to preserve the legend of Klaris and the three criminals who wanted to steal the treasure are presumably arrested.

Cast

Bud Abbott as himself
Lou Costello as himself
Marie Windsor as Madame Rontru
Michael Ansara as Charlie
Dan Seymour as Josef
Richard Deacon as Semu
Kurt Katch as Dr. Gustav Zoomer
Richard Karlan as Hetsut
Mel Welles as Iben
George Khoury as Habid
Eddie Parker as Klaris, the Mummy
Mazzone-Abbott Dancers as dance troupe
Chandra Kaly and His Dancers as dance troupe
Peggy King as vocalist

Cast notes
Costello's daughter, Carole Costello, has a small part as a flower girl. She was 16 years old at the time.

Although Abbott and Costello were called "Pete Patterson" and "Freddie Franklin" in the script and in the closing credits, they used their real names onscreen during filming.

Production
Abbott and Costello Meet the Mummy was filmed from October 28 through November 24, 1954 and is the last film that Abbott and Costello made for Universal Pictures, although Universal released a compilation film of clips from their films, titled The World of Abbott and Costello in 1965. The day after filming completed, Abbott and Costello arrived in New York City to ride on the first float of the annual Macy's Thanksgiving Day Parade.

Beginning with Universal's The Mummy's Hand (1940), the Mummy was called "Kharis". However, in this film, it is called "Klaris". Stuntman Eddie Parker (billed as "Edwin") played the mummy.  He had previously doubled Lon Chaney, Jr. in Universal's earlier Mummy films.

Home media
This film has been released several times on DVD.  Originally released as a single DVD on August 28, 2001, it was released three times as part of different Abbott and Costello collections: The Best of Abbott and Costello Volume Four, on October 4, 2005; on October 28, 2008, as part of Abbott and Costello: The Complete Universal Pictures Collection; and in 2015 in the Abbott and Costello Meet the Monsters Collection. The film was released as part of the 3-disc The Mummy: The Complete Legacy Collection  and the 21-disc Universal Classic Monsters: Complete 30-Film Collection on September 2, 2014.

Merchandise
The design for the Mummy figure in the 1986 Universal-licensed Classic Movie Monsters series from Imperial Toys was based on the monster from this film.

See also
List of American films of 1955

References
Notes

External links

Joe Dante on Abbott and Costello Meet the Mummy at Trailers From Hell

1955 films
1955 horror films
American black-and-white films
Abbott and Costello films
1950s English-language films
Mummy films
Films directed by Charles Lamont
American sequel films
American parody films
American comedy horror films
American buddy comedy films
1950s buddy comedy films
1950s parody films
1950s fantasy comedy films
Universal Pictures films
American crossover films
Films about lizards
Films set in Egypt
1950s comedy horror films
Films scored by Hans J. Salter
Films scored by Henry Mancini
1955 comedy films
Comedy crossover films
Fantasy crossover films
Horror crossover films
1950s American films